María Cristina Uribe is a Colombian journalist and news presenter born in Medellín. Between 2002 and 2011 she presented Noticias Uno.

Uribe majored in Social Communication and Journalism at the Pontifical Bolivarian University in 1991. Her television debut was on a programme on the regional channel Teleantioquia, where she would later present a newscast.

Later, Uribe would appear on national newscasts such as QAP Noticias and Noticiero de las Siete on  Canal A and CM& on Canal Uno. In 1998 she would move to Caracol Noticias until 2002, where she joined Noticias Uno.

Uribe left Colombia for the United States between 2005 and 2007 after receiving, with her husband Daniel Coronell, death threats. Coronell was the director of Noticias Uno.

References

External links 
Profile in Noticias Uno (Spanish)

Living people
Colombian television journalists
Colombian women journalists
Colombian women television journalists
People from Medellín
Year of birth missing (living people)